The Socialist Reich Party was a West German political party founded in the aftermath of World War II in 1949 as an openly neo-Nazi-oriented splinter from the national conservative German Right Party (DKP-DRP). The party achieved some electoral success in northwestern Germany (Lower Saxony and Bremen). In 1952, the SRP was the first political party to be banned by the Federal Constitutional Court.

Origins 
It was established on 2 October 1949 in Hameln by Otto Ernst Remer, a former Wehrmacht major general who had played a vital role in defeating the 20 July plot, Fritz Dorls, a former editor of the CDU newsletter in Lower Saxony, and Gerhard Krüger, leader of the German Student Union under the Third Reich, after they had been excluded from the DKP-DRP. The SRP saw itself as a legitimate heir of the Nazi Party; most party adherents were former NSDAP members. Its foundation was backed by former Luftwaffe Oberst Hans-Ulrich Rudel.

Views 
The party claimed Chancellor Konrad Adenauer was a United States puppet and that Grand Admiral Karl Dönitz was the last legitimate President of the German Reich as he had been appointed by Adolf Hitler. It denied the existence of the Holocaust, claimed that the United States built the gas ovens of the Dachau concentration camp after the Second World War and that films of concentration camps were faked. The SRP also advocated Europe, led by a reunited German Reich, as a "third force" against both capitalism and communism. It demanded the re-annexation of the former eastern territories of Germany and a "solution of the Jewish question". According to Karl Dietrich Bracher, "SRP propaganda concentrated on a vague 'popular socialism' in which the old Nazis rediscovered well-worn slogans, and also on a nationalism whose championship of Reich and war was but a thinly disguised continuation of the Lebensraum ideology". The SRP also promoted the stab-in-the-back myth, structured itself in a very hierarchical manner reminiscent of the Führerprinzip, organized meetings that featured uniformed guards, and "succeeded temporarily in presenting Remer as the protector of the Third Reich against the 'traitors' of the resistance."

According to Martin A. Lee, although the SRP was anti-communist, it focused on criticizing Britain and the United States for "splitting their beloved Fatherland in two" and avoided criticism of the Soviet Union in the hope that a future deal could be made with the Soviets to reunite Germany. The SRP took the stance that Germany should remain neutral in the emerging Cold War and opposed the West German government's Atlanticist foreign policy. In case of war between the Soviet Union and the West, Remer "insisted that Germans should not fight to cover an American retreat if the Russians got the upper hand in a war", and said that he would "show the Russians the way to the Rhine" and that SRP members would "post themselves as traffic policemen, spreading their arms so that the Russians can find their way through Germany as quickly as possible". Martin A. Lee alleges that these statements attracted the attention of Soviet officials, who became willing to fund the SRP for tactical reasons. According to Lee, for a few years in the early 1950s the SRP received Soviet funds while the Communist Party of Germany did not due to being purportedly viewed as "ineffectual".

Election results 

Dorls had been elected as a DKP-DRP deputy to the Bundestag parliament in the 1949 election. The SRP gained a second seat in parliament, when MP Fritz Rössler (alias Dr. Franz Richter) joined the party in 1950. In May 1951 it won 16 seats in the Lower Saxony state assembly (Landtag) election, receiving 11.0% of the votes with strongholds in the Stade region (21.5%; Verden district: 27.7%). It included as a member the much decorated Luftwaffe ace Heinz Knoke. In October 1951 it gained 7.7% of the votes in Bremen and won 8 seats in the city's Bürgerschaft parliament.

Membership 
The SRP had about ten thousand members. Affiliated associations were the Reichsfront paramilitary organisation and the Reichsjugend youth wing, which were banned by a decision of the Federal Minister of the Interior on 4 May 1951. On the same day, the West German cabinet decided to file an application to the Federal Constitutional Court to find the SRP anti-constitutional and to impose a ban. In anticipation of this judgment, the party dissolved itself on 12 September, but this decision was not accepted by the Federal Constitutional Court. Before the ban, Remer had compared the situation of the SRP with that of the early Christians, referred to High Commissioner John J. McCloy as "the Pontius Pilate who had caused Herod [to] crucify the SRP", and declared that "if we should be banned, we shall descend into the catacombs". On 23 October 1952 the court according to Article 21 Paragraph 2 of the Basic Law adjudicated the party unconstitutional and dissolved, prohibited the founding of any successor organisations, withdraw all Bundestag and Landtag mandates and seized the party's assets (BVerfGE 2, 1). 

Four years later, the Communist Party of Germany was also banned. They are still the only political parties with Bundestag representation to be outlawed by the Constitutional Court in the Federal Republic of Germany.

See also
 Black Front
 Third Position

Notes

External links
Germany's New Nazis 1951 pamphlet about the SRP and other neo-nazi groups by the Anglo-Jewish Association

Politics and race
Banned political parties in Germany
Defunct political parties in Germany
Political parties established in 1949
1949 establishments in West Germany
Far-right political parties in Germany
Fascist parties in Germany
Banned far-right parties
Political parties disestablished in 1952
1952 disestablishments in West Germany
Neo-Nazism in Germany
German nationalist political parties
Neo-fascist parties
Neo-Nazi political parties in Europe
Holocaust denial in Germany
Soviet Union–West Germany relations